The Shire of Colac was a local government area about  west-southwest of Melbourne, the state capital of Victoria, Australia.

History

Colac was first incorporated as a road district on 11 May 1859, and became a shire on 10 May 1864. On 31 May 1901, it was divided into four ridings, although these were later abolished. A significant portion of the shire, along with the Shires of Heytesbury and Winchelsea, seceded on 6 May 1919, to form the Shire of Otway. On 19 January 1938, the town of Colac itself split away, to form the Borough of Colac, later proclaimed on the 26 January 1960 as the City of Colac.

On 23 September 1994, the Shire of Colac was abolished, and along with the City of Colac, the Shire of Otway and parts of the Shires of Heytesbury and Winchelsea, was merged into the newly created Shire of Colac Otway.

Towns and localities

Population

* Estimate in the 1958 Victorian Year Book.

References

External links
 Victorian Places - Colac Shire

Colac